Muireann Ní Bhrolcháin (15 May 1955 – 14 April 2015) was an Irish academic and activist.

A native of Salthill, Galway City, Ní Bhrolcháin was a historian who researched early Irish literature, history, and genealogy, with a particular interest in Gaelic women. Her father, Cillian Ó Brolcháin (1905-1976), was professor of physics at UCG (now National University of Ireland, Galway). Her mother was domestic science teacher Mairéad Coughlan of Macroom, County Cork.

Her funeral service was attended by, among others, by President of Ireland Michael D. Higgins. She was survived by her partner and two daughters.

Bibliography
 "Women in early Irish myths and sagas", Crane Bag (4/1), 1980, pp. 12–19
 "An Banshenchas", Léachtaí Cholm Cille (12), 1982, pp. 5–29
 "Leabhar Laighean", Léachtaí Cholm Cille(13), 1982, pp. 5–40
 "A possible source for Seathrún Céitinn's Foras Feasa ar Éirinn", Éigse (19/1), 1982, pp. 61–81
 "The manuscript tradition of the Banshenchas", Ériu (33), 1982, pp. 109–135
 "Scéal Dheirdre", Léachtaí Cholm Cille (14), 1983, pp. 39–89
 "Maol Íosa Ó Brolcháin: his work and family", Donegal annual (38), 1986, pp. 3–19
 "Maol Íosa Ó Brolcháin: an assessment", Seanchas Ard Mhacha: journal of the Armagh Diocesan Historical Society (12/1), 1986, pp. 43–67
 "Maol Íosa Ó Brolcháin agus a chine", Léachtaí Cholm Cille (16), 1986, pp. 87–109
 Maol Íosa Ó Brolcháin, Maigh Nuad, An Sagart, 1986 
 "Re tóin mná: in pursuit of troublesome women", Ulidia (1), 1994, pp. 115–121
 "The Banshenchas revisited", Chattel, servant or citizen: women’s status in church, state and society Papers read before the XXIst Irish Conference of Historians, held at Queen’s University of Belfast, 27–30 May 1993, edited by Mary O’Dowd and Sabine Wichert. 1995, pp. 70–81.
 "The Tara-Skryne or the Gabhra Valley in early Irish literature", Ríocht na Midhe: records of the Meath Archaeological and Historical Society (17), 2006, pp. 1–15
 "Who was Gormlaith's mother? A detective story", Lost and Found II – Rediscovering Ireland’s past,  2009, pp. 83–94.
 "Serglige Con Culainn: a possible re-interpretation", Ulidia (2), 2009, pp. 344–355
 An introduction to early Irish literature, Dublin: Four Courts, 2009
 "Death-tales of the early kings of Tara", Landscapes of cult and kingship,  2011, pp. 44–65.
 "The Banshenchas: genealogy and women of the Ulster Cycle", Ulidia (3), 2013, pp. 75–85
 " Irish Jezebels: women talking. Gendered discourse in early Irish literature", Saltair saíochta, 2013, pp. 199–210

See also
 Banshenchas
 Gormflaith ingen Murchada
 Book of Leinster

References

External links

20th-century Irish historians
21st-century Irish historians
People from County Galway
Irish-language writers
1955 births
2015 deaths